Vicente Rodríguez is the name of:

Vicente Rodríguez (baseball), Cuban baseball catcher
Vicente Rodríguez (boxer), Spanish boxer
Vicente Rodríguez (footballer), Spanish footballer
Vicente Rodríguez (politician), Paraguayan politician